State Highway 66 (SH-66) is a state highway located entirely within Latah County, Idaho, United States. The highway is maintained by the Idaho Transportation Department.

Route description

SH-66 begins at the Washington state line as a continuation Palouse Cove Road, which connects to the city of Palouse. From the state line, the highway travels southeast through a rural area and turns east to reach its terminus at US-95 north of Viola. The route is a two-lane undivided road for its entire length.

Major intersections

References

066
Transportation in Latah County, Idaho
State highways in the United States shorter than one mile